Anna Tatishvili (born February 3, 1990) is a Georgian-American former professional tennis player.

In her career, Tatishvili won eleven singles and eight doubles titles on the ITF Women's Circuit. On 8 October 2012, she reached her career-high singles ranking of world No. 50. On 21 May 2012, she peaked at No. 59 in the doubles rankings.

Her biggest achievement was a fourth-round appearance at the 2012 US Open, in which she was defeated by then-world No. 1 Victoria Azarenka, in straight sets.

At the 2015 US Open, Tatishvili soared through the qualifiers to face the world No. 8, Karolína Plíšková, in the first round of the main draw. Using her aggressive returns and dominant ground strokes, Tatishvili defeated the eighth seed in just 51 minutes.

Competing for Georgia Fed Cup team, Tatishvili has a win–loss record of 10–3.

She announced her retirement from professional tennis on 26 March 2020, citing recurring injuries.

Personal life
Tatishvili started playing tennis at the age of four and plays right-handed. She is currently coached by Ean Meyer. Tatishvili was granted American citizenship in 2014; she began competing for the United States at the 2014 Internationaux de Strasbourg.

Anna has an older sister, Tamta.

Grand Slam performance timelines

Singles

Doubles

WTA career finals

Doubles: 3 (1 title, 2 runner-ups)

ITF finals

Singles: 17 (11 titles, 6 runner-ups)

Doubles: 17 (8 titles, 9 runner-ups)

Notes

References

External links

 
 
 
 
 

1990 births
Living people
American female tennis players
American people of Georgian (country) descent
Female tennis players from Georgia (country)
Georgian emigrants to the United States
Sportspeople from Boca Raton, Florida
Sportspeople from Tbilisi
Tennis people from Florida
Tennis players at the 2012 Summer Olympics
Olympic tennis players of Georgia (country)
People with acquired American citizenship
21st-century American women